Juliane Robra (born 8 January 1983, in Herdecke, Germany) is a Swiss retired judoka that competed in the 70 kg-category and currently 4th Dan. Robra won bronze medals at the 2010 and the 2012 European Judo Championships and is an eight time Swiss national champion. In 2012, she was nominated to compete as a member of the Swiss team in the 2012 Summer Olympics in London.

References

External links
 
 

Swiss female judoka
Living people
1983 births
Olympic judoka of Switzerland
Judoka at the 2012 Summer Olympics
People from Herdecke
Sportspeople from Arnsberg (region)
European Games competitors for Switzerland
Judoka at the 2015 European Games
21st-century Swiss women